NIR or Nir may refer to:

Science and technology
 Near-infrared, a region within the infrared part of the electromagnetic radiation spectrum
 Near-infrared spectroscopy, a spectroscopic method that uses the near-infrared region (from 780 nm to 2500 nm).
 National Identity Register, a former UK database
 National Internet registry, which coordinates IP address and other resource allocation
 NIR, proposed variation of the SECAM colour television system in the Soviet Union
 Numéro d'inscription au répertoire national d'identification des personnes and numéro d'inscription au répertoire, national identity numbers; see INSEE code

Places
 Nir, Iran (disambiguation), several places in Iran
 Negros Island Region, one of the 18 regions of the Philippines
 Northern Ireland (FIFA country code: NIR, ISO 3166 code: GB-NIR), a part of the United Kingdom
 Ness Islands Railway, a miniature railway in scotland

Other uses
 Nir (name), a Hebrew given name and surname
 Northern Ireland Railways, the railway operator in Northern Ireland
 Rate of natural increase, a demographic metric of population increase

See also
 NIRS (disambiguation)